Wong Nai Tun Tsuen is a small village situated in the area of Shap Pat Heung, located in Tai Tong, which is situated in the south of Yuen Long, in the New Territories in Hong Kong.

Administration
Wong Nai Tun Tsuen is a recognized village under the New Territories Small House Policy.

Features
Wong Nai Tun Tsuen is close to the Lychee Mountain, which is situated in Tai Tong. The village comprises the offices for Shap Pat Heung, and also a little restaurant and a main bus stop connecting both sides of Yuen Long.

Education
Wong Nai Tun is in Primary One Admission (POA) School Net 73. Within the school net are multiple aided schools (operated independently but funded with government money) and one government school: South Yuen Long Government Primary School (南元朗官立小學).

References

External links

 Delineation of area of existing village Wong Nai Tun (Shap Pat Heung) for election of resident representative (2019 to 2022)
 Webpage about Wong Nai Tun Tsuen
 Antiquities Advisory Board. Historic Building Appraisal. Nos. 12-14 Wong Nai Tun Tsuen Pictures
 Antiquities Advisory Board. Historic Building Appraisal. Saam Wo Tong, No. 15 Wong Nai Tun Tsuen Pictures

Villages in Yuen Long District, Hong Kong
Shap Pat Heung